The Leopard of Honour is a life's work achievement award at the Locarno International Film Festival held annually in Locarno, Switzerland. The award has been given out since 1989. The award especially denotes recognition of auteur cinema and creative and audacious filmmaking. Starting 2009 the prize was named in Italian and after its sponsor, becoming the "Pardo d'onore Swisscom".

Winners 

 1989 – Ennio Morricone
 1990 – Gian Maria Volonté
 1991 – Jacques Rivette
 1992 – Manoel de Oliveira
 1993 – Samuel Fuller
 1994 – Kira Muratova
 1995 – Jean-Luc Godard
 1996 – Werner Schroeter
 1997 – Bernardo Bertolucci
 1998 – Freddy Buache and Joe Dante
 1999 – Daniel Schmid
 2000 – Paul Verhoeven and Paolo Villaggio
 2001 – Sundance Institute
 2002 – Sydney Pollack
 2003 – Ken Loach
 2004 – Ermanno Olmi
 2005 – Terry Gilliam, Abbas Kiarostami, and Wim Wenders
 2006 – Aleksandr Sokurov
 2007 – Hou Hsiao-hsien
 2008 – Amos Gitai
 2009 – William Friedkin and Isao Takahata
 2010 – Jia Zhangke and Alain Tanner
 2011 – Abel Ferrara
 2012 – Leos Carax
 2013 – Werner Herzog
 2014 – Agnès Varda
 2015 – Marco Bellocchio and Michael Cimino
 2016 – Mario Adorf and Alejandro Jodorowsky
 2017 – Todd Haynes and Jean-Marie Straub
 2018 – Bruno Dumont
 2019 – John Waters
 2021 – John Landis
 2022 – Matt Dillon

See also
 Locarno Film Festival
 75th Locarno Film Festival

References

External links 
 Official site

Locarno Festival
Swiss film awards